İbrahim Refik Saydam (8 September 1881 – 8 July 1942) was a Turkish physician, politician and the fourth Prime Minister of Turkey, serving from 25 January 1939 until his death on 8 July 1942.

Biography
Saydam was born in Istanbul in 1881 as the son of Hacı Ahmet Efendi of Çankırı. After completing primary and secondary education in Fatih Military Junior High School, he entered to Military School of Medicine in 1899. He went on a training course at Gülhane as of graduating with the rank of doctor captain on 4 November 1905. He was assigned as a doctor at Maltepe Military Hospital and Feshane Factory between the years 1907-1910 and improved his expertise in military camps and hospitals by being sent to Germany in 1910.

He was a medic in the Ottoman Army during the dissolution of the empire. He created a medicine to cure typhus, which was used largely by the Central Powers.

Saydam was one of the key people of the Independence War. He landed at Samsun with Mustafa Kemal (later named: Atatürk) in 1919 to start the resistance in Anatolia. He was known as a reformist while he was the Prime Minister. Just three years after his death, the one-party period came to an end in Turkey.

Political life

Saydam became the vice-president of the Department of Health of the Ministry of War on 1 December 1913 and was promoted to the rank of major on 1 June 1915. Meanwhile, he established the Institute of Bacteriology and his vaccines against epidemics and especially typhus had been effective. After the truce, he assigned to the order of 9th Army Inspectorship and passed to Anatolia along with Mustafa Kemal as the health inspector of the army, soon named as the 3rd Army Inspectorship, on 15 May 1919. He attended to Erzurum and Sivas Congresses, came to Ankara with the delegation committee and joined to the opening ceremony of the Grand National Assembly of Turkey with the elections held for the first term as the deputy of Bayazıt on 23 April 1920. He was elected as the Minister of Health in the Council of Ministers under the presidency of Fevzi Pasha, as the Minister of Health and Social Relief upon the resignation of Adnan, and resigned from ministry suggesting his sickness on 14 December 1921.

Being elected as İstanbul deputy, he officiated as the Minister of Health under the cabinet of İsmet Pasha in 2nd, 3rd, 4th, and 5th sessions.

After the death of Atatürk, at the Second Bayar Government formed on 11 November 1938, Saydam performed as the Minister of Interior and was assigned as the general secretary of the Republican People's Party. He was appointed to Prime Ministry of the 11th and 12th government of Turkey by President İsmet İnönü as İstanbul Deputy at the 6th session elections on 25 January 1939.

During this duty, he died in İstanbul on 8 July 1942 and was buried in Ankara.

Endeavoring to extend the health services and establishing health facilities, especially the Hıfzıssıha Foundation which is today known with his name, at the period of his health ministry, he also tried to protect the nation from the negative impacts of World War II during the period of prime ministry. He was never married.

See also
 List of prime ministers of Turkey

References

Sources
 Ministry of Culture and Tourism, the General Directorate of Cultural Heritages and Museums

External links
 Refik Saydam Hıfzısıhha Center
 

1881 births
1942 deaths
20th-century prime ministers of Turkey
Physicians from Istanbul
Ottoman Military Medical Academy alumni
Ottoman military doctors
Ottoman Army officers
Members of the Special Organization (Ottoman Empire)
Ottoman military personnel of World War I
Turkish people of the Turkish War of Independence
Turkish military doctors
Republican People's Party (Turkey) politicians
Government ministers of Turkey
Prime Ministers of Turkey
Ministers of National Education of Turkey
Ministers of the Interior of Turkey
Health ministers of Turkey
Deputies of Istanbul
Members of the 1st government of Turkey
Members of the 2nd government of Turkey
Members of the 4th government of Turkey
Members of the 5th government of Turkey
Members of the 6th government of Turkey
Members of the 7th government of Turkey
Members of the 10th government of Turkey
Members of the 11th government of Turkey
Members of the 12th government of Turkey
19th-century physicians from the Ottoman Empire
20th-century physicians from the Ottoman Empire
Burials at Cebeci Asri Cemetery
Members of the 2nd Parliament of Turkey